Notiophilus aeneus, also known as the brassy big-eyed beetle, is a species of ground beetle in the family Carabidae. It is found in North America. Approximately 5-6mm long, it is dark colored with a brassy tinge and large eyes. Adults are diurnally active in spring and summer.

References

Further reading

 

Nebriinae
Articles created by Qbugbot
Beetles described in 1806